Earl Gunasekara is a Sri Lankan politician, a member of the Parliament of Sri Lanka and the Deputy Minister of Plantation Industries. He was a Member of Parliament elected from the District of Polonnaruwa representing the United National Party.

References

See also 
Politicial system of Sri Lanka

Living people
Members of the 11th Parliament of Sri Lanka
Members of the 12th Parliament of Sri Lanka
Members of the 13th Parliament of Sri Lanka
Members of the 14th Parliament of Sri Lanka
Government ministers of Sri Lanka
United National Party politicians
United People's Freedom Alliance politicians
1960 births
Alumni of Kingswood College, Kandy